The Infiltrators was the twenty-first novel in the spy series Matt Helm by Donald Hamilton. It was first published in 1984.

Plot summary
Assassin Matt Helm is assigned to protect a female spy newly released from prison, who may or may not hold the key to a conspiracy to overthrow the American government.

External links
Synopsis and summary

1984 American novels
Matt Helm novels